Abbasi (also Romanized as ‘Abbāsī; also known as ‘Abbās) is a village in Teshkan Rural District, Chegeni District, Dowreh County, Lorestan Province, Iran. At the 2006 census, its population was 190, in 46 families.

References 

Towns and villages in Dowreh County